Hemraj Verma is an Indian politician and a member of the Sixteenth Legislative Assembly of Uttar Pradesh in India. He represents the Barkhera constituency of Uttar Pradesh and is a member of the Bhartiya Janta party political party.

Early life and  education
Hemraj Verma was born in Pilibhit district. He attended the  Upadhi Mahavidyalaya, Pilibhit and attained bachelor's degree.

Political career
Hemraj Verma has been a MLA for one term. He represented the Barkhera constituency and is a member of the Samajwadi Party political party.

He lost his seat in the 2017 Uttar Pradesh Assembly election to Kishan Lal Rajpoot of the Bharatiya Janata Party.

Posts held

See also

 Barkhera (Assembly constituency)
 Sixteenth Legislative Assembly of Uttar Pradesh
 Uttar Pradesh Legislative Assembly

References 

Samajwadi Party politicians
Uttar Pradesh MLAs 2012–2017
People from Pilibhit district
1976 births
Living people